Charles Karel Uhlir (July 30, 1912 – July 9, 1984) was a Major League Baseball outfielder who played for one season. He played with the Chicago White Sox for 14 games during the 1934 Chicago White Sox season.

External links

1912 births
1984 deaths
Major League Baseball outfielders
Chicago White Sox players
Baseball players from Chicago
People from Spirit Lake, Iowa